Kurt Malangré (18 September 1934 – 4 October 2018) was a German politician and lawyer from Aachen. A member of the CDU, he served as Lord Mayor of Aachen from 1973 to 1989 and as a Member of the European Parliament from 1979 to 1999.

Malangré belonged to a family of Wallonian origin that moved from Belgium to Stolberg in the mid 19th century. He studied law and became an attorney, and started his political career in November 1969 when he became a member of Aachen's city council. In 1972 he was elected Mayor of Aachen, and from 1973–1989 he served as  Lord Mayor. From 1979 to 1999 he was also Member of the European Parliament.

Malangré was a supernumerary member of Opus Dei. For his dedication for the good of the city and its citizens he was appointed honorary citizen of Aachen in 2004.

Malangré died on 4 October 2018 at the age of 84.

References

1934 births
2018 deaths
People from Aachen
People from the Rhine Province
German people of Belgian descent
Mayors of Aachen
Christian Democratic Union of Germany politicians
Members of the Order of Merit of North Rhine-Westphalia
Officers Crosses of the Order of Merit of the Federal Republic of Germany
Opus Dei members
MEPs for Germany 1979–1984
MEPs for Germany 1984–1989
MEPs for Germany 1989–1994
MEPs for Germany 1994–1999
German Roman Catholics